Pennington County is the name of two counties in the United States:

 Pennington County, Minnesota
 Pennington County, South Dakota